Empire Township is a township in Ellsworth County, Kansas, USA.  As of the 2000 census, its population was 174.

Geography
According to the USGS, it contains two cemeteries: Buckeye and Scates.

The streams of Alum Creek, Bluff Creek, Clear Creek, Sand Creek, Skunk Creek and Thompson Creek run through this township.

Transportation
Empire Township contains one airport or landing strip, Kanopolis State Park Airport.

References
 USGS Geographic Names Information System (GNIS)

External links
 US-Counties.com
 City-Data.com

Townships in Ellsworth County, Kansas
Townships in Kansas